True Britt is a best-selling autobiography, published in 1980, by the actress Britt Ekland.

Ekland describes her marriage with Peter Sellers, relationships with Rod Stewart and Lord Lichfield and affairs with, among others Warren Beatty and 'Count' Ascanio Cicogna, and discovering she was nearly bankrupt at a supposedly prolific time in her career.

Personal life
Ekland refers to Peter Sellers as 'Sellers', he in turn called her 'Britvic'.  She describes his obsessive behaviour and obsession with pleasing the Royal Family, both contributing factors in their ultimate divorce.

I would squirm with embarrassment at the demeaning lengths he would stoop to in order to ingratiate himself with the Royal family.  It was contemptible.

Their relationship did not end with divorce though.

Any thoughts I harboured that my divorce from Sellers would put an end to our relationship were premature.  Indeed, my relations with my ex-husband after our divorce were almost as bizarre as the marriage itself.

Ekland's relationship with Rod Stewart lasted for over two years during which time a continual contention was Stewart's Scrooge like attitude towards money.  Ekland is scathing of this aspect of Stewart's character.

It was true he (Rod Stewart) had bought our house on Carolwood. But the day to day running of the house fell to me and I could not charge all of the bills to Rod.  He even protested bitterly if I didn't buy the groceries at the cheapest store in town!  I also paid Rod a hundred dollars a month for the upkeep of my two children while we lived in the household together and, of course, I took care of the nanny's wages.

Rod liked to play the genial dinner host but he was at his most magnanimous if others were picking up the tab ... Birthdays and seasonal festivities rarely prompted Rod to buy presents.  In order for him not to feel any kind of embarrassment among his friends and relatives, I would have to buy the necessary gifts and sign the card in his name.

Our telephone bill was always a headache ... Once all three of our lines were cut off and we had to pay 240 dollars to get them plugged back in again.

References

1980 non-fiction books
Show business memoirs